Karim Dahou (born 15 May 1982 in Orange, Vaucluse) is a French former professional footballer who played as a midfielder. His previous notable clubs include Olympique de Marseille and FC Lorient. He is also of Moroccan and Algerian descent and has represented Morocco at the Olympic level.

References

Living people
1982 births
French sportspeople of Moroccan descent
French sportspeople of Algerian descent
Moroccan people of Algerian descent
People from Orange, Vaucluse
Sportspeople from Vaucluse
French footballers
Footballers from Provence-Alpes-Côte d'Azur
Association football midfielders
Ligue 1 players
Olympique de Marseille players
FC Lorient players
Nîmes Olympique players